Gandzasar originally refers to Gandzasar monastery in Nagorno Karabakh.

Gandzasar may also refer to:
FC Gandzasar Kapan, an association football club based in Kapan, Armenia
Gandzasar Stadium, a football stadium in Kapan, home of FC Gandzasar Kapan
Gandzasar Kapan Training Centre, is the training ground and academy base of FC Gandzasar Kapan